Cobbs is a surname, and may refer to

Arnett Cobb (1918–1989), American jazz saxophonist born Arnette Cleophus Cobbs
Bill Cobbs (born 1934), American actor
Blair Cobbs (born 1989), American boxer
Call Cobbs Jr. (1911–1971), American jazz organist
Clarence H. Cobbs (1908–1979), American clergyman and broadcaster
Janet Cobbs (born 1967), American volleyball player
Simmie Cobbs Jr. (born 1995), American football player
Tasha Cobbs (born 1981), gospel musician,                                      
 now known as Tasha Cobbs Leonard after she married church pastor Kenneth Leonard.
Willie Cobbs (born 1932), blues musician

See also
Cobbs Lake Creek, Canada
Cobbs Creek, Philadelphia, Pennsylvania
Cobb (disambiguation)
Cobb (surname)